Vipsania (likely born between 27-21 BC and sometimes called Vipsania Marcella Minor or Vipsania Marcellina to differentiate her from her sisters) was an ancient Roman noblewoman of the first century BC. She was married to the politician Marcus Aemilius Lepidus and was likely the daughter of Roman general Marcus Vipsanius Agrippa and his second wife Claudia Marcella Major (the niece of emperor Caesar Augustus).

History

Early life
Vipsania was likely born between 27 BC and 21 BC to Marcus Vipsanius Agrippa and his second wife Claudia Marcella Major, the eldest daughter of emperor Augustus sister Octavia Minor. From her father she likely had an older (assumed due to the age difference between their husbands) full sister  and two older half sisters (one who married Quintus Haterius and another named Vipsania Agrippina who married the future emperor Tiberius) as well as five younger half-siblings named Gaius Caesar, Lucius Caesar, Agrippina the Elder, Vipsania Julia and Agrippa Postumus from her father's third and last marriage to Julia the Elder. From her mother she also likely had several younger half siblings, among them Lucius Antonius and Iulla Antonia.

Marriage
Vipsania likely married Marcus Aemilius Lepidus the consul of 6 AD as his first wife, when they were both relatively young. She was the niece of his father's recently wed second wife, Claudia Marcella Minor, so the marriage was likely made to improve their political standing. The two likely had children, an inscription to an assumed son survives on the Basilica Aemilia. Ronald Syme has speculated that this man may have been the husband of an Appuleia recorded in an anecdote by Pliny to have been married to a Marcus Lepidus. The anecdote describes Appuleia to have divorced her husband because of his alcoholism, which caused him to drink himself to death. A woman named Aemilia Lepida is known to be the consuls' daughter, but it is unknown if she was a daughter by Vipsania. If she is not the mother of Lepida then that would imply that she died relatively young.

See also
 List of Roman women
 Women in ancient Rome

Notes

References

Vipsanii
20s BC births
Julio-Claudian dynasty
1st-century BC Roman women
1st-century Roman women
1st-century deaths
Children of Marcus Vipsanius Agrippa